White-vented bulbul may refer to various species in the bulbul family of passerine birds:

 Common bulbul (Pycnonotus barbatus), found in Africa 
 Light-vented bulbul (Pycnonotus sinensis), found in South-east Asia

Birds by common name